Coupvent Point is a headland, with several off-lying rocks, projecting north from Trinity Peninsula,  southwest of Lafarge Rocks. The name "Roche Coupvent" (Coupvent Rock) was given by Captain Jules Dumont d'Urville to a feature in the vicinity. The present name revives the d'Urville naming, given for August Coupvent-Desbois, an officer on the Zélée and later the Astrolabe.

References 

Headlands of Trinity Peninsula